Dilshan Sanjeewa is a Sri Lankan cricketer. He made his List A debut for Puttalam District in the 2016–17 Districts One Day Tournament on 25 March 2017. He made his first-class debut for Chilaw Marians Cricket Club in the 2018–19 Premier League Tournament on 7 February 2019. He made his Twenty20 debut for Chilaw Marians Cricket Club in the 2018–19 SLC Twenty20 Tournament on 23 February 2019.

References

External links
 

Year of birth missing (living people)
Living people
Sri Lankan cricketers
Chilaw Marians Cricket Club cricketers
Puttalam District cricketers
Place of birth missing (living people)